Elizabeth Catherine McAlpine (born September 21, 1999) is an American singer-songwriter.

Early life and education 
Lizzy McAlpine grew up in Narberth, Pennsylvania, in the suburbs of Philadelphia. She has written music since she was in 6th grade. She attended Lower Merion High School, where she sang in a co-ed a cappella group and did theater.

McAlpine studied songwriting at Berklee College of Music located in Boston before leaving in her junior year to pursue music full-time. In April 2020 at the beginning of the COVID-19 pandemic, she started the Instagram #BerkleeAtHome streaming concert series.

McAlpine's father passed away in mid-March 2020. She wrote the song "Headstones and Land Mines" about him on her first album, Give Me A Minute, and dedicated the song "chemtrails" to him on her second album, Five Seconds Flat.

Career 
In 2018, McAlpine released her debut EP, Indigo. She studied in Spain in the fall of 2019, where she wrote her debut studio album, Give Me a Minute. The album was released in August 2020, to critical acclaim. The album has been streamed millions of times on Spotify and other digital service providers. The Dallas Observer named it one of the best albums of 2020, and BBC Media Centre has called her an "up-and-coming vocalist". In April 2021, McAlpine released an 8-song EP, When the World Stopped Moving: The Live EP. She made her late-night debut on November 22, 2021, performing "Erase Me" on Jimmy Kimmel Live!.

McAlpine has garnered supporters from TikTok and Instagram, with several publications calling her a "TikTok star". Her unreleased song "You Ruined the 1975", posted in June 2020, has over 8 million views on TikTok as of April 2021.

McAlpine released her second studio album, Five Seconds Flat on April 8, 2022. The album debuted at number five on US Billboard Heatseekers chart, while also peaking at number nine on Alternative New Artist Albums and number 19 on Top New Artist Albums charts. One song on the album, "Ceilings," went viral on TikTok, making it the most streamed song from the album.

Following the release of her album, McAlpine announced her debut headline tour in 2022. In November 2022, McAlpine performed a set on NPR Music's Tiny Desk Concert with the band Tiny Habits as backing vocalists. NPR listeners ranked her in the top 10 Tiny Desk Concerts of 2022.Her tour starts in April 2023, performing in several countries.

Musical style 
Her musical style has been described as "folk-focused", "folk-pop", and a blend of "jazz, pop, and R&B". Her collaborators include Jacob Collier, Dodie, Tom Rosenthal, Ben Kessler, John Mayer, Finneas, and Thomas Headon.

Discography

Studio albums

EPs

Singles

As lead artist

As featured artist

Other charted songs

Guest appearances

References 

1999 births
Living people
Musicians from Philadelphia
Berklee College of Music alumni
Singer-songwriters from Pennsylvania